Estadio Nueva Chicago is a multi-use stadium in Buenos Aires, Argentina. It is currently the home ground for Nueva Chicago. The stadium holds 28,500.

References

External links
Satellite view

Nueva Chicago
Sports venues in Buenos Aires
N